My Survival as an Aboriginal is a 1979 Australian documentary film directed by Essie Coffey and produced by Coffey, Alec Morgan and Martha Ansara. It was the first documentary directed by an aboriginal woman.

References

External links
My Survival as an Aboriginal at Creative Spirits
My Survival as an Aboriginal at Australian Screen Online

My Survival as an Aboriginal at alaminOz Movies

Documentary films about Aboriginal Australians
1979 films
1979 documentary films
Australian documentary films
Documentary films about women
Autobiographical documentary films